Cost to Serve (CTS or C2S) is an accountancy tool used to calculate the profitability of serving the needs of a particular customer account, based on the actual business activities and overhead costs incurred in servicing that customer or customer type. Businesses are able to reposition customers and services, and how they are served to improve overall margin.

The Australian Food and Grocery Council describes Cost to Serve (C2S) as  Gartner's glossary defines the term as a form of analysis which

Supply chain management
In the context of supply chain management the tool can be used to analyse how costs are consumed throughout the supply chain. It shows that each product and customer demands different activities and has a different cost profile. The product and customer profiles are often illustrated using a Pareto analysis curve which highlights those that contribute most to the company's profit and those that erode it. 

Cost to Serve is considered less resource-intensive than Activity Based Costing (ABC) as it focuses on aggregate analyses around a blend of cost drivers. The tool gives an integrated view of costs at each stage of the supply chain, providing a fact-based view to unravel the complexity of multiple supply chains and channels to market. It enables a focus on both long-term decisions and the identification of easily-achieved process changes to improve profitability. Seifert and Markoff note that{{quote|Cost-To-Serve is one of those supply chain ideas that is so intuitive and the benefits so clear, yet in speaking to supply chain executives we have seen that in fact it is rarely applied in a sustainable, repeatable way.

See also 
 Pareto principle
 Activity based costing
 Supply chain management

Notes

References

Further reading 
Christopher, M (2005), ‘Logistics and Supply Chain Management’, 3rd edition, Financial Times/Prentice Hall
Braithwaite, Samakh (1998), 'The Cost-to-Serve Method', The International Journal of Logistics Management, Volume 9 Issue 1 p69-84, ISSN 0957-4093
Guerreiro, Bio, Merschmann (2008), 'Cost-to-serve measurement and customer profitability analysis', The International Journal of Logistics Management, Volume 19 Issue 3 p389-407, ISSN 0957-4093
Australian Food and Grocery Council / Focus Information Logistics, 'A Guide to using cost to serve to enable effective customer engagement'

Supply chain management